Roberto Amadio (born 10 July 1963, in Portogruaro, Italy) is an Italian sports manager and former road and track cyclist. Professional from 1985 to 1989, he was the world champion in the team pursuit in 1985. He also competed in the team pursuit event at the 1984 Summer Olympics. Since 2005 he is team manager and director of the team .

References

1963 births
Living people
Italian male cyclists
Cyclists from the Metropolitan City of Venice
Olympic cyclists of Italy
Cyclists at the 1984 Summer Olympics
People from Portogruaro
20th-century Italian people